We're Getting Nowhere  The Terrible Three talk back to your TV is a vlog (video blog) that is posted Thursdays on AfterEllen where the three regular hosts  Karman Kregloe, Jill Bennett and Dara Nai (aka The Terrible Three), talk about new episodes of various programs related mainly, but not exclusively to lesbian themed TV-shows. Series covered in the vlog include South of Nowhere, America's Next Top Model and The L Word. In the broadcasts episodes are recapped, re-enacting of various scenes with and without the use of sock puppets and other props may occur, relevant and irrelevant trivia and general opinions on the episode in question are shared with the audience. After recapping Season One of The L Word (when it premiered on Logo), WGN was retired.

Location
Originally filmed in the bedroom of Jill Bennett's residence in Los Angeles, California, it has since been moved to her living room. A few episodes very early on in the show had taken place in Dara's living room as well.

Guests on We're Getting Nowhere
Several actors, writers and comedians have been guests on the vlog. Guests have included:

Maeve Quinlan
Mandy Musgrave
Matt Cohen
Sarah Warn
Lori Grant
Bridget McManus
Maile Flanagan
Liz Feldman
Jane Lynch
Meredith Scott Lynn
Coley Sohn
Elizabeth Keener

References

External links
We're Getting Nowhere on Afterellen.com
AfterEllen.com

American entertainment websites